Cherry Street Coffee House is a chain of coffeehouses in Seattle, in the U.S. state of Washington.

History and locations
The business was founded by co-owner Ali Ghambari. There were five locations as of April 2011.

There were seven locations as of late 2012. An eighth was planned to open in the Pioneer Square district in 2013. A waterfront location expected to open in May 2017 was delayed. The waterfront location did not come to fruition.

According to the Puget Sound Business Journal, the business "saw sales plummet ... down at about 60 percent" in March 2020, following the arrival of the COVID-19 pandemic. In May 2021, Benjamin Cassidy of the Seattle Metropolitan said seven of eleven locations had closed, and staff decreased from 120 to less than 20.

Menu

In addition to coffee, the business has served "dirty" chai lattes (chai tea with espresso) and a drink called the Milkyway with mocha with caramel sauce.

The food menu has included veggie burgers with vegan patties made from tofu, mushrooms, carrots, black beans, parsley, mint, and cilantro. The location at First Avenue and Clay Street has offered "dinner menu of authentic Persian dishes available for dine-in or take-out" on select days. The Khoresh-e Fensenjan has chicken in a sauce made with pomegranate and walnuts, and the barberry pistachio chicken is served wit saffron rice, red barberries, and pistachios. The Adas Palow has basmati rice with lentils and caramelized onions. The menu has also included bagels, pastries, salads, sandwiches, and soups.

In 2019, Cherry Street began serving cocktails and weekend brunch.

Reception

In 2011, Allecia Vermillion of Eater Seattle said, "The internationally influenced menu includes a veggie burger that over the years has quietly racked up legions of rabid devotees, both vegetarian and omnivore." The website's Megan Hill included the business in a 2021 overview of "The Best Coffee Shop Bites in Seattle". She wrote, "Cherry Street Coffee serves solid brews across its four locations, but the extensive food menu is a definitive draw. The menu is mostly built from ingredients made onsite, from pastries baked daily to bagel breakfast sandwiches to the Persian rice bowl and falafel." Brittany Fowler selected Cherry Street for Seattle in Business Insider's 2015 list of the best coffee shops in 13 major U.S. cities. The Daily Hive included the business in a 2020 list of the "12 best coffee shops to visit in Seattle".

In 2022, Molly O'Brien of Fodor's recommended, "Visit Cherry Street Coffee House to experience a welcoming community space that's been a part of the Seattle brew scene since the late 90s." Alison Fox included the business in Travel + Leisure 2022 list the "coolest" coffee shops in the U.S. and said, "Seattle is known for its rainy weather, and this Seattle-based mini coffee chain is the perfect place to spend a cozy afternoon when the climate isn't exactly cooperating."

References

External links
 

Coffee in Seattle
Coffeehouses and cafés in Washington (state)
Restaurants in Seattle